Adrushya is a 2022 Indian Marathi-language thriller film directed by Kabir Lal and produced by Ajay Kumar Singh.The film stars Pushkar Jog, Manjari Fadnis and Riteish Deshmukh in lead roles. It is remake of 2010 Spanish film Los ojos de Julia. Adrushya was scheduled to be release on 20 May 2022.

Synopsis 
This is the story of two twin sisters Sayli and Sanika. Suffering from Progressive Blindness, Sayli commits suicide and Sanika comes to Dehradun with her husband to find out the reasons behind it. Despite having a loving husband Lavoon, the incident of her sister's death does not allow Sanika to remain silent. Doctors have predicted the possibility of her becoming blind like Sayli due to excessive stress. Sanika also has to lose her husband while trying to find out the real reason behind Sayli's death. Finally Sanika also has to face blindness. Sanika's eyes are operated after receiving a donor. After that, the game of thriller unfolds in the true sense of mystery.

Cast 
 Pushkar Jog as Lavoon
 Manjari Fadnis as Sayali aka Sanika
 Ajay Kumar Singh 
 Anant Jog 
 Riteish Deshmukh in Special appearance

Production

Filming
Shooting started on 30 January 2021 in Dehradun, India. On 19 July 2021, entire shooting of the film has been completed.

Critical response 
Adrushya film received negative reviews from critics. Kalpeshraj Kubal  of The Times of India gave the film 2 stars out of 5 and wrote "Adrushya doesn't make an impact on the viewer. This is a film that could have been better, but isn't". Salonee Mistry of Pune Mirror gave the film 1 stars out of 5 and wrote " What could have been interesting and never seen before Marathi horror film, ‘Adrushya’ is a lost opportunity of taking a brilliant concept to a whole new level, owing to poor execution". A Reviewer of Maharashtra Times gave the film 2 stars out of 5 and wrote "From the beginning to the end, the movie can be predicted at many places. The writing continues to feel weak". Sanjay Ghaware of Lokmat gave the film 2 stars out of 5 and wrote "Failing to strike the right balance between mystery and thrills, there is nothing special about this film. Therefore, it would be wrong to say that this movie is a must watch".

References

External links
 

2022 films
2020s Marathi-language films
Indian thriller films